Palm Jebel Ali is an artificial archipelago in Dubai, United Arab Emirates which began construction in October 2002, was originally planned to be completed by mid-2008 and has been on hold since. Creative Kingdom provided master planning services for the island and Leisure Quest International (USA) developed entertainment and attraction concepts.  The project, which is 50 percent larger than Palm Jumeirah, is proposed to include six marinas, a water theme park, 'Sea Village', homes built on stilts above the water, and boardwalks that circle the "fronds" of the "palm" and spell out an Arabic poem by Sheikh Mohammed bin Rashid Al Maktoum.

The breakwater was completed in December 2006, and infrastructure work began in April 2007. Major construction will not begin until most of the infrastructure work is complete. Following the financial crisis of 2008 work was suspended and the developers, Nakheel, have confirmed no work would take place on the development in the near future.

Nakheel invited several architects to design one of the buildings for the Palm on a 300,000 m2 area. The winning design was a building by Royal Haskoning, who also worked on several other projects in Dubai. The residential villas to be built and sold by the developer were designed by Serendipity By Design LLC, a firm based in Dubai, United Arab Emirates. The villa types were to be categorised by size and style; 40 series (the largest), garden villas and  signature villas.

In the first signs of a slowing Dubai property market, the prices of properties being sold on Palm Jebel Ali were reported to have fallen by 40% in the two months to November 2008, with the fall being attributed to the Financial crisis of 2007–2010.

In 2009, the Dubai Land Department investigated complaints into Nakheel stalling the Palm Jebel Ali project.  Nakheel offered investors alternative homes in other projects but these were inferior properties.  In March 2011 Nakheel offered refunds to property investors.

Palm Jebel Ali's developer planned to house more than 250,000 people on it.

In the original schedule, by 2021, the first phase of four theme parks would have opened on the Crescent. These planned parks, which together will be called "World of Discovery," will be developed and operated by the Busch Entertainment Corporation. The parks include SeaWorld, Aquatica, Busch Gardens and Discovery Cove. The World of Discovery will be located at the top of the Crescent, which will form into the shape of an orca (reminiscent of Shamu).

In 2013, State news agency WAM said a decree by ruler Sheikh Mohammed bin Rashid al Maktoum said a special legal committee would be established over the building bubble.  This included using funds following liquidation of scores of cancelled building projects to repay investors who lost billions in the Emirates property market.  It was suggested that this would settle disputes related to projects that had been officially cancelled by the Real Estate Regulatory Authority (RERA).

In November 2014, 74 owners on Palm Jebel Ali wrote to the Ruler of Dubai via the Ruler's Court regarding the stalled PJA project.

On 16 March 2015, Nakheel Chairman Mr Ali Lootah confirmed that Nakheel remains committed to the project long term but asked "what can I do" for original investors.

In October 2018, Sanjay Manchanda, CEO of Nakheel, confirmed that there are no immediate plans to restart development of the project.  In July 2021, it was announced that Nakheel planned to restart the project by considering plans involving building villas on the island.

In April 2022, reports began to circulate that Nakheel had petitioned the Dubai courts and secured a hearing in the absence of investors (as no notice given) to secure a judgement to formally cancel the Palm Jebel Ali project, which was apparently granted on 19 May 2022.  Consequently 724 previous villa contracts were made null and void as per the judgement, with the aim to return only the original investment, without recognition of any secondary market transaction premium paid, or compensation as per the clause in the Nakheel property contract (Sales Purchase Agreement).  Furthermore, no account was made of any opportunity cost including potential return on investment including even compound interest.

In September 2022, Nakheel announced a rebranding exercise.  Soon after, it revealed its plans to relaunch Palm Jebel Ali.  It has been reported in the Wall Street Journal that high vaccination rates and zero taxes is making Dubai a pandemic boomtown, with many wealthy Russians expected to move there, now access to Western property has become significantly more challenging with International bans and enhanced anti-money laundering laws.

Recently, it was revealed that Nakheel is nearing completion of $4.6 billion of debt restructuring to relaunch its landmark projects. “Nakheel is paying a lower spread and getting more money for new projects, including Palm Jebel Ali,” stated one banker on the deal. Nakheel plans to build 1,700 villas and 6,000 apartments.  This has now been confirmed.

In a Markets report published by Bloomberg on 17 November 2022, reports began to emerge that Nakheel was attempting to refund original investors of up to nearly twenty years, their original investment back without compensation or interest.  Nakheel, a government-backed developer - chaired by Mohammed Ibrahim Al Shaibani, the managing director of the Emirate's sovereign wealth fund, the Investment Corporation of Dubai - says "it is giving back what it received from the development's original investors and can't help if people bought at higher prices in resale deals over the past two decades."  Nakheel has offered voluntary refunds in the past, which some investors have taken, whilst others have remained on the basis of the promise that the development will be built, albeit not in the short term.

After years of waiting, that moment appears now to have arrived, with Nakheel stating that it plans to restart a revamped version of the project in early 2023, now that the market has recovered.  In the interim, the developer is offering just the original investment back or a credit note in the same development for the value of the invested sum received 'enhanced' by 50% of the same sum.  However, waterfront villas are selling at a high premium and this credit note won't cover even 20% of the revamped property value.

Dubai leads the 25-city forecast for 2023 with price growth expected to reach 13.5 percent. According to Knight Frank, prices were expected to rise by 2 percent on average in 2023. According to the report, the price rises can be attributed to a shortage of new supply and string inflows of ultra-high-net-worth individuals (UHNWI) who are targeting second homes in Dubai. The report reveals that the overriding challenge for the emirate is the shortage of waterfront homes as demand for waterfront properties are seeing a rise.

Gallery

See also
Palm Islands
The World, another artificial island project in Dubai.
The Universe
Dubai Waterfront
Nakheel, the real estate developer of Palm Islands
Tourism in Dubai

References

External links

The Palm official website
Images + Information on Palm Island
Van Oord dredging and marine contractors
Jan De Nul Group dredging and marine contractors

Nakheel Properties
Resorts in Dubai
Artificial islands of Dubai
Buildings and structures under construction in Dubai
Emirate of Dubai
Peninsulas of the United Arab Emirates